The 1962 National Soccer League season was the thirty-ninth season under the National Soccer League (NSL) name. The season began in late April and concluded in early November with Toronto Italian Virtus defeating reigning champions Toronto Ukrainia for the NSL Championship. The regular-season title was clinched by FC Olympia-Harmonie Toronto.

Overview 
There was a major reshuffle in the league's membership due to competition from the Eastern Canada Professional Soccer League (ECPSL). Two of the National Soccer League's (NSL) major clubs Polish White Eagles and Toronto Roma were accepted into the ECPSL. The league also lost its final representative from Quebec with the departure of Montreal Concordia. The rivalry between the two leagues began to have a financial strain on the NSL, which caused a major decrease in their gate earnings at Stanley Park Stadium. Since the creation of the ECPSL in 1961, the NSL's annual average attendance record dropped from 231 000 in 1960 to 35 000 in 1962. The average attendance at Stanley Park was around 1000 throughout the 1962 season. 

Despite the departure of some of the league's top clubs, the membership increased to 12 members. The new entries were primarily former members of the Toronto and District Soccer League. The new additions were Hellenic, Toronto Italian Virtus, Queen City, Toronto Croatia, Toronto Estonia, and Toronto Macedonians. The city of Oshawa was added to the circuit with the acceptance of Oshawa Hungarians, and Oshawa Italia. Toronto Italian Virtus was granted a franchise with the hopes of attracting the Italian diaspora, which fan support the league had lost due to the departure of Toronto Italia and Toronto Roma to the ECPSL. 

Several league members capitalized on the usage of ECPSL players as the ECPSL season concluded earlier around August. The procession of ECPSL players to the NSL caused issues with the Canadian Soccer Football Association and Ontario Soccer Association over the control of player registrations. In an attempt to curb the free movement of players the governing bodies issued fines to clubs and barred players that failed to obtain permission from their parent clubs.

Teams

Coaching changes

Playoffs   
The preliminary round of the playoffs was contested in a round-robin style with two separate groups where the two group winners would qualify for the final. The championship final was contested in a two-game series. Toronto Ulster United later withdrew from the playoffs due to financial issues. The top six teams qualified for the playoffs.

Group A  
  
 

  

Toronto Italian Virtus advances to the final.

Group B   

Toronto Ukrainia advances to the final.

Finals    

 
Toronto Italian Virtus won the series 4-3 on goals on aggregate.

References

External links
Canada Soccer Yearbook of Champions, Records and Results 2022
RSSSF CNSL page
thecnsl.com - 1962 season 

1962–63 domestic association football leagues
National Soccer League
1962